is a national highway in Japan. A beltway around Tokyo, it links the major prefectural capital cities of Yokohama (in Kanagawa Prefecture), Saitama (in Saitama Prefecture), and Chiba (in Chiba Prefecture) as well as Hachiōji (in Tokyo). It also serves Yokosuka and Sagamihara (in Kanagawa Prefecture), Kasukabe (in Saitama Prefecture), and Kisarazu (in Chiba Prefecture). The total length is 241 km.

Along with the Ken-Ō Expressway, Route 16 connects the entire length of the Technology Advanced Metropolitan Area (TAMA) Network region - an inland industrial area covering an area of 3000 km2, covering 74 municipalities and home to over 10 million people of whom 4 million work in the TAMA Network firms. In 1998 goods shipped from TAMA had twice the shipment value of the Silicon Valley.

History
Before 1963, the route did not follow a loop, but ran from Futtsu to Yokosuka to Yokohama. The Yokosuka-Yokohama section was designated as National Highway 45 on 8 July 1887 and became National Highway 31 in 1920 and Route 16 in 1952. On 1 April 1963, Route 16 was extended to Kisarazu, replacing a portion of Route 127 and all of Route 129 when these sections were promoted to Class 1 highways, forming the current route around Tokyo.

Route data
Length: 
Origin and Terminus: Nishi-ku, Yokohama (originates and ends at junction with Route 1)
Major cities: Yokosuka, Sagamihara, Hachioji, Kawagoe, Saitama, Kasukabe, Kashiwa, Chiba and Kisarazu

See also

References

External Link 
 The National Route 16 - Google Map

16
016
Ring roads in Japan
Roads in Chiba Prefecture
Roads in Kanagawa Prefecture
Roads in Saitama Prefecture
Roads in Tokyo